Isla Cabeza de Caballo, or Head of the Horse, is an island in the Gulf of California, located within Bahía de los Ángeles east of the Baja California Peninsula. The island is uninhabited and is part of the Ensenada Municipality. There is a lighthouse located on Isla Cabeza de Caballo along the channel into the harbor of Bahía de los Ángeles.

Biology

Isla Cabeza de Caballo has 4 species of reptiles: Crotalus mitchellii (speckled rattlesnake),	C. polisi (horsehead island rattlesnake)  Sauromalus hispidus (spiny chuckwalla), and Uta stansburiana (common side-blotched lizard).

References

http://herpatlas.sdnhm.org/places/overview/isla-cabeza-de-caballo/124/1/

Islands of Baja California
Islands of the Gulf of California
Islands of Ensenada Municipality
Uninhabited islands of Mexico